Shriram Group is an Indian conglomerate headquartered in Chennai. It was founded on 5 April 1974 by R. Thyagarajan, AVS Raja and T. Jayaraman. The group had its beginning in chit funds business and later on entered the lending and insurance businesses.

Companies
Shriram Finance is the flagship company of the Group which provides financial services such as commercial vehicle finance, passenger vehicle finance, SME finance and retail lending (personal loans, gold loans and two-wheeler loans). It was formed in 2022 as the result of a merger of Shriram City Union Finance and Shriram Capital into Shriram Transport Finance.
 Shriram Housing Finance is a subsidiary of Shriram Finance and mainly provides home loan services.
Shriram Life Insurance is the life insurance arm of the group, and a joint venture between Shriram Group and South African company Sanlam.
Shriram General Insurance is engaged in commercial and retail vehicle insurance, home insurance and travel insurance. It is a joint venture between Shriram Group and Sanlam.
Shriram Financial Ventures is the holding company and promoter of Shriram Group's financial services and insurance businesses. It is jointly owned by Shriram Ownership Trust (SOT) and Sanlam Group.
Shriram Properties is a real estate developer focusing on mid-income housing projects, primarily in South India.
 Shriram Fortune is the financial services distribution arm of the group.
Shriram AMC is an asset management company focused on mutual funds.
Shriram Insight is a retail stockbroker.
Shriram Wealth provides wealth management advisory services.
Shriram Automall is a vehicle auction platform started as a subsidiary of Shriram Transport Finance. In 2018, CarTrade acquired a majority stake in Shriram Automall.

References

External links

Financial services companies based in Chennai
Conglomerate companies of India
1974 establishments in Tamil Nadu
Indian companies established in 1974
Conglomerate companies established in 1974